Postcode lottery could refer to:

Postcode lottery
National Postcode Lottery, a lottery in The Netherlands
People's Postcode Lottery, a lottery in Great Britain